Seghill is a large village located on the Northumberland border which is the county boundary between Northumberland and Tyne and Wear.

Governance 
Seghill is part of the Seghill with Seaton Delaval ward. Margaret Richards (Labour) is the sitting County councillor. There are three parish councillors which represent the ward, Simon Heartland (Conservative), Daniel Nesbitt (Labour), and Stephen Stanners (Labour).

Economy 
Seghill used to be a busy pit village within the Northumberland Coalfield.  Seghill Colliery was closed during the so-called Robens era, on 28 September 1962. The folk song "Blackleg Miner" originates from the area and contains the lyric:
Divint gan near the Seghill mine
Across the way, they stretch a line
To catch the throat and break the spine
Of the dirty blackleg miner.

The song was written during the 1844 lockout of coal miners.  Many of the striking miners were evicted from their homes in Seghill during this dispute.  Thomas Burt wrote of the situation:
the very magnitude of the evictions, extending over nearly the whole of the mining districts of Northumberland and Durham, made it impossible to find house accommodation for a twentieth part of the evicted.  Scores of the Seghill families camped out by the roadside between that village and the Avenue Head.

Transport 
Seghill served by a railway station but it was closed in November 1964 along with the rest of the passenger services on the Blyth & Tyne route north of Backworth. It still has a level crossing which sees the occasional goods train.

Education 
 
There are two schools in Seghill: Seghill First School is a small first school which covers Reception to Year 4 and is run by Northumberland County Council. There is also Atkinson House EBD School.

Sports 

On Seghill Welfare Field Seghill Rugby and Football Club regularly practice on Saturday and Sunday mornings. The Annual Gala and Fair is held on the Welfare Field. It is a chance for the whole village to enjoy an otherwise normal day. It gives younger children of the village the chance to ride on floats, compete in races and fancy dress competitions and of course enjoy the amusements and attractions, provided by the Seghill Treats Committee. In the summer months, when the nights are light, AFC Seghill can also be found training on the welfare field.

AFC Seghill
Formed in 2007, AFC Seghill play in the Community Champions League. The league consists of teams from North of the Tyne and games take place on a Sunday afternoon. Managed and Captained by Ian Clark, Seghill had a good first season finishing 3rd in the league, just one place below a playoff position. On 6 April 2008 Seghill played in the NK Cup Final against Sports For Youth in sub zero conditions. Despite losing 2 players to the cold in the 2nd half Seghill came from behind twice to win the game 3-2 and claim their first piece of silverware in their rookie season.

Despite starting their second season with an unbeaten run that stretched beyond Christmas and building up a double figure lead over their nearest rivals, Seghill were eventually undone by the weather. Due to the large number of postponed fixtures throughout the season Seghill were left to play out the last few weeks with 3 or more games per week. This led to problems with squad members securing time off work and with just a couple of games left Seghill were pipped at the post to finish 2nd in the league. Despite it being a better showing than the previous season there was widespread disappointment that the season had ended without any silverware.

1st Seghill Scouts
Next to the Welfare Field there is a small scout hut where 1st Seghill Scouts meet on a Monday Night.

Public services 
There are three main streets in Seghill. Main Street has the Netherfield Surgery, local Premier (retailer) shop (with Post Office), a small newsagents, Seghill Methodist Church, several take-away shops, and a barbers and hairdressers. On Front Street there are Shiremoor Compressors Ltd and Seghill Comrades Club. On Barrass Ave there was the Seghill Social Club which has now closed down and has been demolished. The Blake Arms is the community public house is situated in the streets of Blaketown and serves delicious food daily.

References

External links

Seghill Online - Seghill Community Website
Durham Mining Museum Website- Seghill Pit
Map of Seghill in 1864
Seghill First School-Not Updated since 2004 
Seghill Rugby Football Club
No To Landfill Campaign
AFC Seghill Official Site.

 
Villages in Northumberland